The Northern Flat is a greyhound racing competition held annually at Newcastle Stadium. The event was switched to Newcastle in 2021 following the closure of Belle Vue Stadium where it had been held from 1927 until 2018.

It was inaugurated in 1927 making it one of the oldest competitions in the racing calendar. The 1971 edition was an eight dog competition, the only time a major competition featured eight runners.

Past winners

Sponsors
1989–1989 (David P.Yates)
1990–1991 (John Smith's Brewery)
1994–1994 (Demmy Racing)
1999–2009 (Ben Holmes Bookmakers)
2011–2015 (Belle Vue Owners Forum)
2016–2018 (BAPP Group of Companies)
2021–present (Arena Racing Company)

Venue & distances 
1927–1971 (Belle Vue, 500 yards)
1975–1998 (Belle Vue, 460 metres)
1999–2004 (Belle Vue, 465 metres)
2005–2018 (Belle Vue, 470 metres)
2021–present (Newcastle, 480 metres)

References

Greyhound racing competitions in the United Kingdom
Sports competitions in Manchester
Recurring sporting events established in 1927
Sport in Newcastle upon Tyne